GPX may refer to:

 Gautampura Road railway station, in Madhya Pradesh, India
 Glutathione peroxidase, an enzyme family
 GP Strategies Corporation, an American consulting firm
 GPS Exchange Format, a data format
 Kawasaki Ninja GPX-250R, a motorcycle